The Elder Scrolls is a series of video games. The term may also refer to:
 The Elder Scrolls: Arena (1994)
 The Elder Scrolls II: Daggerfall (1996)
 An Elder Scrolls Legend: Battlespire (1997)
 The Elder Scrolls Adventures: Redguard (1998)
 The Elder Scrolls III: Morrowind (2002)
 Tribunal (2002)
 Bloodmoon (2003)
 The Elder Scrolls Travels: Stormhold (2003)
 The Elder Scrolls Travels: Dawnstar (2004)
 The Elder Scrolls Travels: Shadowkey (2004)
 The Elder Scrolls IV: Oblivion (2006)
 Knights of the Nine (2006)
 Shivering Isles (2007)
 The Elder Scrolls V: Skyrim (2011)
 Dawnguard, (2012)
 Hearthfire (2012)
 Dragonborn (2012)
 The Elder Scrolls V: Skyrim Pinball (2016)
 Special Edition (2016)
 Skyrim VR (2017)
 The Elder Scrolls Online (2014)
 Morrowind (2017)
 Summerset (2018)
 Elsweyr (2019)
 The Elder Scrolls: Legends (2016)
 The Elder Scrolls: Blades (2019)
 The Elder Scrolls VI (TBA)

See also 
 Elder (disambiguation)
 Scroll (disambiguation)